The 2017–18 Slovenian Football Cup was the 27th edition of the Slovenian Football Cup, Slovenia's football knockout competition.

Competition format

Qualified teams

2016–17 Slovenian PrvaLiga members
Aluminij
Celje
Domžale
Gorica
Koper
Krško
Maribor
Olimpija
Radomlje
Rudar Velenje

Qualified through MNZ Regional Cups
2016–17 MNZ Celje Cup: Šampion and Šoštanj (withdrew)
2016–17 MNZ Koper Cup: Jadran Dekani and Tabor Sežana
2016–17 MNZG-Kranj Cup: Triglav Kranj and Zarica Kranj
2016–17 MNZ Lendava Cup: Hotiza and Nafta
2016–17 MNZ Ljubljana Cup: Krka and Ilirija
2016–17 MNZ Maribor Cup: Akumulator Mežica and Korotan Prevalje
2016–17 MNZ Murska Sobota Cup: Beltinci and Mura
2016–17 MNZ Nova Gorica Cup: Tolmin and Brda
2016–17 MNZ Ptuj Cup: Videm and Drava Ptuj

First round
Šoštanj withdrew before the competition began; Triglav Kranj received a bye.

Round of 16

Quarter-finals

First leg

Second leg

Semi-finals

First leg

Second leg

Final

References
General

Specific

Slovenian Football Cup seasons
Cup
Slovenia